Halimatu Ibrahim Ayinde (born 16 May 1995) is a Nigerian professional footballer who plays as a midfielder for FC Rosengård and the Nigeria women's national team. She previously played for Western New York Flash in the United States, Delta Queens in Nigeria and Eskilstuna United in Sweden.

Club career
Halimatu Ayinde was signed by the American team Western New York Flash on 15 June 2015 from the Nigerian domestic team Delta Queens. She made her debut with a start in the 1–0 loss against the Houston Dash; she was substituted in the 79th minute. After spending a season with the team, during which time she made nine appearances, including five in the starting lineups, she was released on 12 May 2016. She had admitted underperforming in her first season with the Flash, but felt that she had improved in the 2016 preseason, scoring against the A team put forward by the University of Vermont. At the time this affected her selection for the Nigeria women's national football team, with Ayinde not being selected for a match against Senegal.

She subsequently joined FC Minsk of the Belarusian Premier League later that year, making her debut in the 3–0 victory over Bobruichanka Bobruisk on 2 September. She was one of three Minsk players to score in the match, and went on to appear for the team in their UEFA Women's Champions League games. Her form continued in her first few games, scoring the only goal in an away match against Nadezhda SDJuShOR-7 Mogilev on her third match for Minsk.

International career 
She was part of the Nigeria national team at the 2015 FIFA Women's World Cup and the winning squad at the 2014 African Women's Championship.

Honours 
 Nigeria
 U-20 Women's World Cup (runners-up): 2014
 African Women's Championship (2): 2014, 2016

References

External links
 
 

Nigeria women's international footballers
Women's association football midfielders
2015 FIFA Women's World Cup players
Nigerian women's footballers
1995 births
Living people
Sportspeople from Kaduna
Western New York Flash players
National Women's Soccer League players
FC Minsk (women) players
2019 FIFA Women's World Cup players
Eskilstuna United DFF players
Damallsvenskan players
Nigerian expatriate women's footballers
Nigerian expatriate sportspeople in the United States
Expatriate women's soccer players in the United States
Nigerian expatriate sportspeople in Belarus
Expatriate women's footballers in Belarus
Nigerian expatriate sportspeople in Sweden
Expatriate women's footballers in Sweden
Delta Queens F.C. players